Stenotrophomonas acidaminiphila is a strictly aerobic, Gram-negative, mesophilic, non-spore-forming and motile bacterium from the genus of Stenotrophomonas which has been isolated from industrial waste water in Mexico. Stenotrophomonas acidaminiphila can degrade polycyclic aromatic hydrocarbons.

References

Further reading 
 
 
 
 

Xanthomonadales
Bacteria described in 2002